List of former state routes in Georgia (U.S. state) may refer to:
 List of former state routes in Georgia (U.S. state, 1–199)
 List of former state routes in Georgia (U.S. state, 200–699)
 List of former state routes in Georgia (U.S. state, 700–1109)